Luis Abelardo Suárez (August 24, 1916 – June 5, 1991) was a Major League Baseball third baseman who played for the Washington Senators in .

External links

1916 births
1991 deaths
Major League Baseball third basemen
Cuban baseball players
Washington Senators (1901–1960) players
Chattanooga Lookouts players
Tampa Smokers players
Havana Cubans players
Sherman–Denison Twins players
Pampa Oilers players
Decatur Commodores players
Sweetwater Braves players